Bumagin (from бумага meaning paper) is a Russian masculine surname, its feminine counterpart is Bumagina. It may refer to
Alexander Bumagin (born 1987), Russian ice hockey player 
Evgeni Bumagin (born 1982), Russian-Kazakhstani ice hockey winger 

Russian-language surnames